The Namibia national badminton team represents Namibia in international badminton team competitions. It is controlled by the Badminton Federation of Namibia. The team is part of the Badminton Confederation of Africa. The Namibian team competed once in the Commonwealth Games in 1994.

The Namibian team reached its highest ranking of 98 on the BWF World Team Ranking in 2012.

History 
The Namibian national team first competed in badminton at the 1994 Commonwealth Games in Victoria, Canada. The team competed in both individual and team events. A total of 7 Namibian badminton players were called in for the team event.

Participation in Commonwealth Games
Mixed team

Current squad 

Men
Alfred Sumaili
Arne Stier
Colbin du Plessis
Francois Maritz
George van Rensberg
Jurgen Leicher

Women
Atushe Shihepo
Christa van Dyk
Ella Scholtz
Gesa Jeske
Lynette Scholtz
Melissa Kring

References 

Badminton
National badminton teams